Established as Vanport College in 1946, Portland State University is a public university officiated as a state institution in 1969. Located in the southwest Portland, Oregon, it is the only public university in the state that is located within a major metropolitan city, and is one of Oregon's largest universities. Its academic programs are organized in nine constituent schools and colleges, and have produced alumni across professions in the arts, sciences, business, academia, politics, and sports. , the university claims over 180,000 alumni worldwide.

Legend 
Notes and abbreviations used
 Individuals who may belong in multiple sections appear only in one. 
 An empty class year or school/degree box indicates only that this information is unknown or unconfirmed.
"DNG" indicates the alumnus or alumna attended but did not graduate; known year(s) of attendance accompany this if available. "N/A" will be present in the degree box for these individuals, as it is confirmed they did not receive degrees.

Colleges and schools
CA – College of Arts
CLAS – College of Liberal Arts and Sciences
CE – College of Education
CECS – Maseeh College of Engineering and Computer Science
CUPA – College of Urban and Public Affairs
GSBP – Graduate School of Book Publishing
SB – School of Business
SSW – School of Social Work
Defunct schools
PSC – Portland State College 
VC – Vanport College

Academia

Architecture and design

Art and literature

Business and finance

Civil society

Entertainment

Film, television, and performing arts

Music

Humanities

Media and communications

Government and politics

Heads of state and government

Governors of the United States

United States congress

State Senators

U.S. Representatives

Other U.S. political figures

Judges

International political figures

Sciences and technology

Sports

Miscellaneous

References

Portland State

Portland State University alumni